Isle of Swords is a pirate novel for young adults by Wayne Thomas Batson, also author of The Door Within Trilogy. First published in 2007, it tells of sailors, pirates, and a mysterious group of monks all working to get a great treasure, the treasure of Constantine. A sequel, Isle of Fire, was published in 2008.

Plot summary

The fates of the crew of the William Wallace are dramatically altered when Anne, daughter of the pirate Captain Declan Ross, finds a young man unconscious on a deserted island.  The young boy had been nearly whipped to death and, when the kind crew of the William Wallace revives him, he has no memory at all of his past.  He soon becomes friends with the crew members, particularly Anne.  All they can determine of the boy's past is that, judging from his confident, daring sailing skills, he was once a pirate.  They dub him Cat based on both his ability to survive his violent whipping and the instrument that probably did it: the cat o'nine tails.

Later, when stopping briefly at a monastery, Captain Ross agrees to the request of the monks dwelling there: to take one of their number, Padre Dominguez, aboard and keep him safe.  Their reason is the priceless map tattooed on Dominguez's back, a map leading to the Isle of Swords, where the legendary Treasure of Constantine awaits.  The monks know that Bartholomew Thorne is after the great riches and, hence, after Dominguez.

On their route to the Isle of Swords, the ship docks temporarily at an island that seems vaguely familiar to Cat.  Though both he and Anne were ordered to stay aboard, Anne encourages her friend to come with her and sneak away from the ship for a time.  Cat reluctantly agrees to the mutinous act, and they steal ashore to search for clues to his past.  They discover an abandoned pirate stronghold that holds signs of a gruesome past, and, to Cat's horror, the place seems slightly familiar.  While trying to flee the place he and Anne are captured by a group of British soldiers headed by Commodore Blake.  They believe the two young pirates know something about the fort and the whereabouts of its former inhabitant: Bartholomew Thorne.

Anne manages to escape and tells Declan of Cat's plight.  Ross rallies a group of men to help him and, together with local friend Jacques St. Pierre, they heroically spring Cat from the island's British jail.  Taking Jacques with them, the crew of the William Wallace sets off again.

After being punished for their mutinous behavior, Cat and Anne sign the ship's articles and become official members of the crew.  When Ross later stops at another island to pick up some final supplies, in his absence Thorne attacks the William Wallace.  He burns the ship and takes Anne and Padre Dominguez as prisoner.

When Ross discovers this he is devastated, but quickly harnesses his emotions into hard resolve to get Anne back.  With the help of his remaining crew members, including Cat, he buys a ship to chase after Thorne.

In the prison of one of Bartholomew's strongholds, two of Thorne's crewmen make the fatal error of whipping Dominguez without their captain's permission.  Now that some of the map is destroyed, Thorne resorts to torturing the monk to make him explain what is broken on the map.  When this fails, Bartholomew turns his torture instruments on Anne, and at this Dominguez breaks down and tells everything.  Thorne, satisfied, leaves Padre in his cell to bleed to death and takes Anne with him, on to the Isle of Swords.

Ross, close behind Thorne, is not close enough to save Dominguez.  When he discovers Bartholomew's deserted fort, Padre is almost dead.  The monk manages to assure Ross that Anne is still alive, and then Dominguez dies.

In a final confrontation in the treasure chamber on the Isle of Swords, Thorne and Ross's crews face off.  The battle ends when Thorne, after identifying with shock Cat as his son, gains the upper hand.  He ties Cat, Ross, and Anne to pillars in the chamber, which is beginning to become unstable due to the eruption of a nearby volcano.  The rest of Ross's crew is forced to join Thorne and he leads them down to his ships, where they begin loading treasure.

Due to some secret help from Stede, Cat, Anne, and Ross escape, though the latter is injured.  They escape to their ship and a sea battle begins.  Ross's crew in the enemy ships sabotage them and then escape to Declan's side.  Commodore Blake, too, joins the fray, having been carefully tipped off earlier by Ross of Thorne's whereabouts.  Thorne is captured and Ross is invited to meet with the British for a parlay.

At the meeting with the Commodore, Ross begins to work out a peaceable offer with Blake about offering a pardon to pirates who stop their ways.  Suddenly, however, a vast tidal wave strikes the town, completely submerging the prison where Thorne was held.  The Commodore, Declan and his group rush to the jails and find, to their horror, that Bartholomew has disappeared.

Characters

Declan Ross - Pirate captain of the William Wallace.  He is a brave, kind man who, even though a pirate, discourages violence and promotes mercy.  Ross's wife Abigail died under mysterious circumstances when their daughter, Anne, was very young.

Anne Ross - Declan's daughter.  Red-headed, feisty and proud, she adores the perilous sailing life.

Cat - A friendly young lad who is fond of Anne.  Though he lost most of his life's memories because of an injury, he is proving himself an adept seaman and a valiant fighter.

Bartholomew Thorne - The villain of this story.  His cruelty on land and at sea had earned him the reputation of one of the most notorious pirates of the Caribbean.  Because of a fire set by the English, Thorne's hands and voice were scarred and his favorite wife Heather was killed.  Chiefly because of the death of his wife, Thorne harbors a deadly, vengeful hatred against the British.

Padre Dominguez - A quiet, tall monk who is nonetheless an extraordinary fighter.  On his back is tattooed a map to the Isle of Swords.

Commodore Blake - A brave Commodore in British Navy, who, though technically Ross's enemy, holds a grudging respect for the honorable pirate.

Nigel - Blake's right-hand man, and the inside man in the British navy for Thorne

Stede - Declan Ross's quartermaster, an intensely loyal man with a pronounced accent and a fierce "thunder gun".

Scully - A ratlike little man who works for Thorne, chiefly as a messenger and spy.

Red Eye - A "powder monkey" on the William Wallace.  He is so named because of a reddish-tinged, blinded eye, the result of a past incident involving some gunpowder.  Though equipped with a fierce passion for all things sharp and dangerous, he a good friend and very faithful to Ross.

Jacques St. Pierre -  Master of all things explosive.  With a passion for "things that go BOOM!", this elegant yet naturally dangerous Frenchman joins Declan's crew midway through the book.

Jules - Ross's largest and physically strongest crew member.  Like nearly all of the men on the William Wallace, he is very devoted to his captain and shipmates.

Nubby - The fierce, one-armed cook of the William Wallace.

Drake- The oldest crew member on the William Wallace, and one who adheres closely to the laws of the sea and its superstitions.

Setting
The story takes place mostly in the real-world Caribbean and in the North Atlantic.  No specific dates are given in the novel, but muskets have been invented, and slavery is still around, though only mentioned once with distaste in the book, so the estimated time period is the 18th century.

Sequel 
The sequel, Isle of Fire, was released on Sept. 9th, 2008.

Sources 
Isle of Swords, by Wayne Thomas Batson
The author's blog
thedoorwithin.com

2007 American novels
Novels about pirates
American young adult novels
Children's historical novels
2007 children's books